Nazem al-Ghazali (given name also spelled Nazim, Nadhim, Nadhem or Nathem) (1921 – 23 October 1963) was one of the most popular singers in the history of Iraq and his songs are still heard by many in the Arab world.

Biography
He was born in the Haydar Khanah quarter in Baghdad, and studied at the Institute of Fine Arts in Iraq. He started his career as an actor, and after a few years turned to singing. He worked at the Iraqi Radio in 1948, and was member of the Andalusian Muashahat Ensemble. In that period, he worked with Jamil Bashir, and together they produced some distinguished works, such as Fog el-Nakhal and Marrou 'Alayya el-Hilween. He was also a student of Muhammad al-Qubbanchi, (el-Kabbandji), one of the most prominent maqam singers of the last century. Nazem was renowned for his popular songs and he had also recorded some maqams. According to many, his refined mellow voice was the finest in the field. He was married to prominent Iraqi Jewish singer Salima Murad.

Band
Nadem Al-Ghazali's band consisted of many prominent musicians known to the Arab world. The flute player, in addition to the khanoun player, were blind.  They are usually the two musicians most commonly seated directly behind Nadem during his concerts.

List of songs
Fog El nakhal
Talaa Min Beit Abuha
Ayartni Bil-Shaeb
Tusbukh Ala Kheir
Gulli Ya Hilu
Hayak Baba Hayak
Shlon
Ma Rida
Ahebak
Samraa

External links
 almashriq.hiof.no
 iraq4u.com

1921 births
1963 deaths
20th-century Iraqi male actors
20th-century Iraqi male singers
Iraqi male actors
Musicians from Baghdad
Singers who perform in Classical Arabic